Marlon Frey (born 24 March 1996) is a German professional footballer who plays as a midfielder for MSV Duisburg.

Club career
Frey joined Bayer 04 Leverkusen in 2004 and was promoted to the senior team in 2015. He made his Bundesliga debut on 12 December 2015 against Borussia Mönchengladbach, replacing Kevin Kampl in the 87th minute in a 5–0 home win. For the 2016–17 season, he was loaned to 1. FC Kaiserslautern and made 11 appearances in the 2. Bundesliga. He left Leverkusen at his contract expiry in 2018.

On 30 August 2018, Frey signed for PSV Eindhoven on a one-year deal to play for their Jong PSV side.

SV Sandhausen announced on 31 May 2019, that Frey had joined the club on a two-year contract.

In January 2021, after being released from his contract by Sandhausen, Frey moved to 3. Liga club MSV Duisburg. He signed a contract until the end of the season. He signed a new two-year contract on 27 May 2021.

Career statistics

References

External links

1996 births
Living people
Footballers from Düsseldorf
Association football midfielders
German footballers
Bundesliga players
2. Bundesliga players
3. Liga players
Eerste Divisie players
Bayer 04 Leverkusen players
1. FC Kaiserslautern
Jong PSV players
SV Sandhausen players
MSV Duisburg players
German expatriate footballers
Expatriate footballers in the Netherlands
German expatriate sportspeople in the Netherlands